The Orrefors Railway Station, located in Orrefors, Nybro Municipality, Sweden and built in 1875, is protected under Swedish law as valuable national heritage. The building has become globally well known through the Swedish film My Life as a Dog which was in part filmed at this site. Ownership of this monument over a railway epoch laid in its grave, was passed from the Swedish State on to artist Eva Fidjeland in 1990.

Disused railway stations in Sweden